Antispila eugeniella is a moth of the family Heliozelidae. It was described by August Busck in 1900. It is found in the US state of Florida.

The wingspan is 3.8 mm. The palpi, face, head, thorax and forewings are shining dark purple. There is a golden-metallic fascia on the middle of the forewing. The hindwings are dark gray with metallic reflections.

The larvae feed on Eugenia species. They mine the leaves of their host plant. The mine has the form of an upper blotch mine. When fully grown it cuts out an oval case which falls to the ground.

References

Moths described in 1900
Heliozelidae